Staffing is the process of finding the right worker with appropriate qualifications or experience and recruiting them to fill a job position or role. Through this process, organizations acquire, deploy, and retain a workforce of sufficient quantity and quality to create positive impacts on the organization’s effectiveness. In management, staffing is an operation of recruiting the employees by evaluating their skills and knowledge before offering them specific job roles accordingly.

A staffing model is a data set that measures work activities, how many labor hours are needed, and how employee time is spent.

Importance 
Staffing helps to find and hire people who are qualified for the job position and will benefit the company. It also improves the quality and quantity of work done by the company because they have staffed the optimum people. Job satisfaction rates are likely to increase because everyone is well-suited for their position and is happy to be doing their specialty of work. Higher rates of productive performance from the company are also common, as they have staffed the right people to do their jobs. It provides employees the opportunity for further growth and development.

Quantity and quality 
Staffing an organization focuses on both the quality and the quantity of the staff.

The quantity is the number of staff. The organization forecasts workforce quantity requirements and then compares it to the available workforce. If the headcount matches the requirement, then the organization is fully staffed. If the requirement exceeds the number of available employees, then the organization is understaffed. If the available staff exceeds the requirements, then the organization is overstaffed and may need to stop hiring and layoff employees. When a company is understaffed, the staffing process may restart.

The quality is having the right person for the job. The right person should have a job and an organization match. The job match involves the employee's knowledge, skills, abilities, and other characteristics and how they work with the job's tasks. The organization match is when the person has the same organizational values as the organization.

Core staffing actives 
The five core staffing actives are recruitment, selection, employment, training, and retaining.

Recruitment 
Herbert Heneman has described an effective recruiting process as the cornerstone of an effective staffing system.

The first step, prior to, the recruiting process  is defined as goals and job descriptions. Organizations assess jobs and job families through the systematic study of job analysis, a process that describes and records job behaviors and activities. Job analysis is generally considered the backbone of effective human resource management, and it is particularly important in staffing functions of recruitment and selection as well as assessing the level of job performance. Job analysis involves the collection of information about jobs in the organization (not the persons holding the jobs). As such, the analysis focuses on duties, responsibilities, knowledge, skills, and other characteristics required to perform the job.

As part of the recruiting process, the organization will have to decide to recruit internally or externally. Internal recruiting is when an organization intends to fill a vacancy from within its existing workforce. External recruitment is when an organization looks to fill vacancies from applicants outside of the company. There are advantages and disadvantages to both methods of recruitment, and they may be used at the same time.

Internal recruitment 
Internal recruitment is generally cheaper and faster and promotes loyalty. The disadvantages are that recruiting from within limits the chances of innovation and will leave a gap in the workforce. Even if an organization has recruited for a position internally, it will still have a gap in the workforce and will need to find a replacement for the vacant position.

If the organization chooses internal recruitment, there are some options on how to communicate the job announcement: open, closed, or hybrid recruitment. In an open recruitment system, all employees are made aware of the job vacancies and they can apply to the job. In a closed recruitment system, only the employees that the organization is interested in know about the job vacancy. In a hybrid recruitment system, the organization uses a mix of open and closed recruitment systems.

External recruitment 
The benefits of external recruitment are that it increases your chances of recruiting experienced and qualified candidates. However, outside recruits will have a limited understanding of the company and company culture, and internal disputes could arise if existing employees feel that they were more suited for the position.

If the organization chooses external recruitment, they will have to decide how to promote the vacancy so it can be filled. Promotional examples include posting the advertisement on their website,  using employment agencies, attending job fairs, using social networks, and checking employee referrals.

Selection 
Selection is an important part of the staffing process, and if done wrong, the organization could lose candidates. The purpose of the selection process is to determine whether a candidate is suitable for employment in the organization or not.  This process starts with the review of the job applications, résumés, and cover letters of the job candidates. The organization then gives an initial interview to eliminate the unqualified candidates.

The next steps are to reduce the candidates to get the finalist for the job. This includes testing, structured interview and contingent assessment. The testing can include personality, ability, and intelligence tests. A structured interview has specific questions to ask and is given by somebody within the organization familiar with the position. The contingent assessment is the last step, and it includes drug tests and medical exams.

Employment 
Employment is the process of hiring the individual who was selected in the selection process. The organization should first propose a job offer, which typically includes starting date, duration of the contract, compensation, starting rate, benefits, and hours of the position. The organization then prepares for the new employee’s arrival. Ideally, the company should make sure that the employee has all of the tools required to do their job effectively, such as security badges, keys, and any other technology.

Training 
After the selection of an employee, the employee receives training. With the various technological changes in modern history, the need for training employees is increased to keep the employees in touch with the various new developments. Staffing can be influenced by how staffers are trained and the type of training they receive.

Training is generally classified into two types, on the job and off the job. Some examples of training programs include:

 Technical training – training that teaches employees about a particular technology or a machine.
 Quality training – trains employees to identify faulty products.
 Skills training – training that is given to employees to perform their particular jobs.
 Soft skills – personality development
 Team training – training establishes a level of trust and synchronicity between team members for increased efficiency.

Retaining 
Employees can leave jobs for a variety of different reasons. Employers should listen to the needs of their employees and make them feel valued. Employers need to create a positive work culture and motivating practices into their organization to keep employees.

Retention methods have a positive impact on the organization’s turnover rate. Benefits can include training, positive culture, growth opportunities within the organization, trust and confidence in leaders, and lower stress from overworking.

Staffing agencies 
Staffing agencies are becoming more common because of their ease of use and low cost. Companies save a lot of money through using a staffing agency because they do not have to spend extra money on employee recruitment or fund any of the screenings new hires must undergo. Using a staffing agency eliminates the need for companies to do extensive advertisements about the positions they are hiring for. The agencies save time by avoiding having to spend a large amount of time searching for applicants and recruiting new people. Staffing agencies provide a large network of job candidates, so it is easy to find people to fill the jobs. They have many tools and the knowledge to find the perfect applicants for the jobs each company needs to fill. If a company has an unexpected need to fill a position, a staffing agency can usually quickly find someone.

See also
 Human resources

References

Human resource management